Stratton High School may refer to:

Stratton Senior High School, Stratton, Colorado
Stratton High School (West Virginia), Beckley, West Virginia
Long Stratton High School, Long Stratton, Norfolk, England